That Time I Got Reincarnated as a Slime is a Japanese light novel series written by Fuse and illustrated by Mitz Vah.  The series is published in Japanese by Micro Magazine and in English by Yen Press.  A manga adaptation by Taiki Kawakami is published in Japanese by Kodansha and in English by their subsidiary Kodansha USA.  A spin-off manga by Shō Okagiri, titled That Time I Got Reincarnated as a Slime: How Monsters Walk, is published digitally by Micro Magazine.

Light novels

Manga

That Time I Got Reincarnated as a Slime

That Time I Got Reincarnated as a Slime: The Ways of the Monster Nation

The Slime Diaries: That Time I Got Reincarnated as a Slime

That Time I Got Reincarnated as a Slime: Trinity in Tempest

That Time I Got Reincarnated (Again!) as a Workaholic Slime

That Time I Got Reincarnated as a Slime: Clayman's Revenge

See also
 List of That Time I Got Reincarnated as a Slime characters
 List of That Time I Got Reincarnated as a Slime episodes

References

External links
  
  
  
 

That Time I Got Reincarnated as a Slime
That Time I Got Reincarnated as a Slime